Carestream Health, formerly Eastman Kodak Company's Health Group, is an independent subsidiary of Onex Corporation which is one of Canada's largest corporations.

History
In 2007, the Kodak Health Group was sold to Onex Corporation for $2.35 billion in cash. Around 8,100 employees transferred to Onex, and Kodak Health Group was renamed Carestream Health.
In April 2017, Carestream Health announced an agreement to sell its Dental Digital business to private equity firms Clayton, Dubilier & Rice and the Hillhouse Capital Management group, part of CareCapital Advisors Limited.
Carestream Dental provides imaging systems and practice management software for general and specialist dental practices.  The dental X-ray film and anesthetics business were not included in the agreement and remain with Carestream Health.

Products
Products include: laser printers with dry film technology, DryView laser imaging film, computed radiography systems, digital radiography systems, and other diagnostic imaging systems for the medical and dental imaging fields. Carestream Health owns more than 800 patents for medical and dental imaging technology. Digital imaging technologies include the DRX-1 series, which allows a wireless connection between the digital X-ray detector and computer system (whether part of their static system or a mobile/portable radiography system).

Medical and Dental Products
Radiology department products for X-ray products and digital image processing, including: Digital radiography rooms and mobile/portable X-ray for general X-ray; Computed Radiography for general X-ray and mammography applications; and X-ray film for general and mammography applications.
Medical printing products , including: Laser printers using dry film technology.

Non-Medical Products
Contract manufacturer / Precision coating offerings, including coating; pilot coating and development; hardcoating; PET manufacturing; TPU film manufacturing; solution preparation and delivery; analytical and quality testing; and converting and packaging.
Non Destructive Testing Products, including: Computed Radiography and X-ray film.

References

Health information technology companies
Companies based in Rochester, New York
Health care companies established in 2007
American companies established in 2007
Dental companies
Medical imaging
Medical technology companies of Canada
Kodak
Canadian companies established in 2007
Onex Corporation
Corporate spin-offs
Companies that filed for Chapter 11 bankruptcy in 2022